West Home is a historic building in Yorba Linda, California. It was the home of Jessamyn West during her childhood. It was listed on the National Register of Historic Places in 1981.

References

Houses in Orange County, California
Houses on the National Register of Historic Places in California
National Register of Historic Places in Orange County, California